German submarine U-826 was a Type VIIC U-boat of Nazi Germany's Kriegsmarine during World War II.

She was ordered on 8 June 1942, and was laid down on 6 August 1943 at F Schichau GmbH, Danzig, as yard number 1589. She was launched on 9 March 1944 and commissioned under the command of Oberleutnant zur See Olaf Lübcke on 11 May 1944.

Design
German Type VIIC submarines were preceded by the shorter Type VIIB submarines. U-826 had a displacement of  when at the surface and  while submerged. She had two shafts and two  propellers.

U-826 was fitted with five  torpedo tubes (four fitted at the bow and one at the stern), fourteen torpedoes or 26 TMA mines, one  SK C/35 naval gun, (220 rounds), one  Flak M42 and two twin  C/30 anti-aircraft guns. The boat had a complement of between 44 — 52 men.

Service history
U-826  participated in one war patrol that yielded no ships sunk or damaged.

On 11 May 1945, U-826 surrendered at Loch Eriboll, Scotland. She was later transferred to Loch Ryan, Scotland, after being transferred to Lisahally first. Of the 156 U-boats that eventually surrendered to the Allied forces at the end of the war, U-826 was one of 116 selected to take part in Operation Deadlight. U-826 was towed out and sank on 1 December 1945, by unknown causes.

References

Bibliography

External links

German Type VIIC submarines
U-boats commissioned in 1944
World War II submarines of Germany
Ships built in Danzig
1944 ships
Maritime incidents in December 1945
World War II shipwrecks in the Atlantic Ocean
Operation Deadlight